Dejean is a surname. Notable people with the surname include:
 Louis Dejean (1872–1954), French sculptor and engraver
 Mike DeJean (born 1970), American baseball player
 Jean François Aimé Dejean (1749–1824), French army officer and minister of state in the service of the First French Republic and the First French Empire
 Jean-Luc Déjean (1921–2006), French writer
 Philippe DeJean (1736–c.1809), judge in Fort Detroit until he was captured during the American Revolution
 Pierre Charles Dejean (1807–1872), French general and politician
 Pierre François Marie Auguste Dejean (1780–1845), French entomologist